Catholics vs. Convicts is a 2016 documentary film about the October 15, 1988 Notre Dame-Miami football game between the Miami Hurricanes of the University of Miami and the Notre Dame Fighting Irish of Notre Dame. 

The documentary is the 87th in ESPN's 30 for 30 series and aired on ESPN following the December 10, 2016 Heisman Award. It premiered to over two million viewers, making it the highest rated 30 for 30 film since 2015. 

Catholics vs. Convicts is directed by Patrick Creadon. At the 69th Primetime Emmy Awards, it was one of that season's 30 for 30 films nominated for Outstanding Documentary or Nonfiction Series.

Background 
In 1985, a rivalry started between the University of Notre Dame and University of Miami football teams after the Miami Hurricanes beat the Notre Dame Fighting Irish 58–7. This loss marked head coach Gerry Faust's last game at Notre Dame.

The rivalry culminated in a showdown three years later, which was dubbed "Catholics vs. Convicts." The name originated from a t-shirt slogan created by Notre Dame students Joe Frederick and Michael Caponigro. The slogan played on Notre Dame's Catholic background and the public perception of Miami's players as college football's "bad boys," a reputation that was reinforced by the arrests of a number of Miami players. Both the Notre Dame Fighting Irish and the Miami Hurricanes came into the game undefeated. Cleveland Gary's controversial "phantom fumble" is examined closely in the film.  While studying the game the filmmakers re-examined a second close call by the referees which had gone largely unnoticed at the time.  Both coaches and several players from the game had never seen the replay, leading many of the subjects to reconsider the outcome of the game. Many sportswriters consider it one of the greatest college football games of all time.

The documentary is partially based on director Patrick Creadon's experience as a Notre Dame undergraduate at the time. Creadon was a senior at Notre Dame in 1988 and knew the students behind the "Catholics vs. Convicts" slogan.

Cast 
Creadon went back to interview several of his classmates for the documentary, including Patrick Walsh, his best friend from high school who was involved in the t-shirt scandal, and Tony Rice, the starting quarterback who lived down the hall from them in Dillon Hall. The film also features interviews with head coaches Lou Holtz and Jimmy Johnson; Notre Dame defensive coordinator Barry Alvarez; Notre Dame players Chris Zorich, Pat Eilers, Pat Terrell, and Todd Lyght, among others; and Miami players Steve Walsh, Cleveland Gary, and Leon Searcy, among others.

Reception 
Writing for The Wall Street Journal, John Anderson called Catholics vs. Convicts a "gripping gridiron drama." Sporting News ranks the film "among the best" of the 30 for 30 franchise.

References 

Notre Dame vs. Miami
Miami Hurricanes football
Notre Dame Fighting Irish football
30 for 30
2016 television films
Films directed by Patrick Creadon